Charles  A. "Red" Jones was a college football player. A prominent end for coach Mike Donahue's Auburn Tigers, he was selected All-Southern in 1916.

References

American football ends
Auburn Tigers football players
All-Southern college football players